Englewood Community Hospital is a private 100-bed health care facility located in Englewood, Florida.

History
The hospital opened in 1985 and specializes in treating heart disease, general surgery, emergency care, urology, and orthopedics.

References

Hospitals in Florida
1985 establishments in Florida
Hospital buildings completed in 1985
Buildings and structures in Sarasota County, Florida